Mama June: From Not to Hot is an American reality television series that airs on We TV. The show premiered on February 24, 2017, and is a spin-off of the TLC reality series Here Comes Honey Boo Boo.

On March 13, 2019, Mama June and her boyfriend, Eugene "Geno" Doak, were both arrested and charged with felony possession of drugs and drug paraphernalia at a gas station in Alabama, with Geno facing an additional charge of domestic violence. Following this, the fourth season premiered on March 27, 2020, and saw the series rebranded as Mama June: From Not To Hot - Family Crisis. The fifth season premiered on March 19, 2021 and was rebranded as Mama June: Road to Redemption with the "From Not To Hot" subtitle removed entirely.

Cast

Main

Recurring
Mike 'Big Mike' Mclarty, June's friend (season 1)
Amber Busby, Jo's daughter and June's niece
Janice Shannon, June's sister-in-law (season 2)
Natasha Fett, June's fitness trainer (season 1)
Ella Grace Efird, Lauryn and Joshua's daughter and June's granddaughter (season 2–present) 
Deborah Tyra, June's rival in the Mother-Daughter Pageant (season 2)
Hannah Stark, Alana's rival in the Mother-Daughter Pageant (season 2)

Episodes

Series overview 
</onlyinclude>

Season 1 (2017)

Season 2 (2018)

Season 3 (2019)

Season 4: Family Crisis (2020)

Season 5: Road To Redemption (2021–22)

Specials

References

External links

2010s American reality television series
2017 American television series debuts
2020s American reality television series
American television spin-offs
English-language television shows
Reality television spin-offs
Television shows set in Georgia (U.S. state)